A law review or law journal is a scholarly journal or publication that focuses on legal issues. A law review is a type of legal periodical.  Law reviews are a source of research, imbedded with analyzed and referenced legal topics; they also provide a scholarly analysis of emerging law concepts from various topics. Law reviews are generated in almost all law bodies/institutions worldwide. However, in recent years, some have claimed that the traditional influence of law reviews is declining.

Unlike other scholarly journals, most law journals in the United States and Canada are housed at individual law schools and are edited by students, not professional scholars. A law school will typically have a "flagship" law review and several secondary journals dedicated to specific topics. For example, Harvard Law School's flagship journal is the Harvard Law Review, and it has 16 other secondary journals such as the Harvard Journal of Law & Technology and the Harvard Civil Rights-Civil Liberties Law Review. Membership and editorial positions on law journals, especially flagship law reviews, is competitive and traditionally confers honor and prestige. Selection for law review membership is usually based on a combination of students' grades, their performance on a short article-writing competition, and an examination on Bluebook legal citation rules.

Overview
The primary function of a law review is to publish scholarship in the field of law. Law reviews publish lengthy, comprehensive treatments of subjects (referred to as "articles"), that are generally written by law professors, judges, or legal practitioners. The shorter pieces, attached to the articles, commonly called "notes" and "comments," are written by law student "members" of the law review.

Law review articles often express the thinking of specialists or experts with regard to problems, in a legal setting, with potential solutions to those problems. Historically, law review articles have been influential in the development of the law; they have been frequently cited as persuasive authority by the courts almost worldwide.

In North America 

In the US, law reviews are normally edited and published by an organization of students at a law school or through a bar association, in close collaboration with faculty members. Law reviews can provide insight and ideas that contribute to the bedrock of jurisprudence. For example, Justice Stanley Mosk of the Supreme Court of California admitted that he got the idea for market share liability from the Fordham Law Review comment cited extensively in the court's landmark decision in Sindell v. Abbott Laboratories (1980).

While most American law schools publish general reviews dealing with broad areas of law, some law schools publish specialized reviews, dealing with a particular area of the law, such as civil rights and civil liberties, international law, environmental law, and human rights. Some specialized reviews focus on statutory, regulatory, and public policy issues.

In Europe 
In Europe, law reviews "contribute to legal scholarship on the place of Europe in the world" and "serve[s] as a forum where the national, international and EU perspectives meet and engage." The reviews focus a lot on the themes of "political science and international relations contributions" and how they relate and interact with the complex policies and principles of "EU’s external relations."

In Africa 
In Africa, law reviews have focused on a wide range of issues: from "legal pluralism and customary law'" to "issues of international law in the African context," including "legal and institutional regional and sub-regional developments, post conflict resolution, constitutionalism, commercial law and environmental law." Some reviews have fostered a discussion on reforms and changes in political and economic administrations.

The Journal of African Law has published articles from LGBT rights in Malawi to the rights of indigenous peoples under the African Charter on Human and Peoples’ Rights.

Trends 
In recent years, a trend has been propagated to have law reviews publish online-only content. Some law journals have abandoned print entirely, instead choosing to publish all of their content only on the Internet.

Some earlier debate centered on how slow and ineffectual law reviews have been to keep pace with the rapid changes in law and scholarship trajectory, especially in the US. The underlying premise was that the reviews focused more on constitutional matters (dealt with more at the Supreme Court level) than with the non-constitutional doctrines of jurisprudence that the larger expanse of the lower courts dealt with.

Editorial staff

United States 

In the United States, law reviews are typically edited by students who are selected to join after successfully completing a “write on competition” at the end of their first year of law school. Grades and class standing are often considered during the application process. As law professor Erwin N. Griswold wrote of the Harvard Law Review: "Some people are concerned that a major legal periodical in the United States is edited and managed by students. It is an unusual situation, but it started that way, and it developed mightily from its own strength". During the 1990s, the American Bar Association followed suit and began coordinating its own practitioner journals with law schools, courting student editorial bodies for publications including Administrative Law Review, The International Lawyer, Public Contract Law Journal, and The Urban Lawyer. Despite Griswold's confidence in student editors, criticism of this practice continues. In 2004, Judge Richard Posner wrote a critical account entitled "Against the Law Reviews" in the magazine Legal Affairs. However, Posner also wrote that his own time as president of the Harvard Law Review represented a "Golden Age ... for student-edited law reviews".

Some law reviews also consider race, gender, and other demographic characteristics of all or a portion of prospective editors in order to increase the diversity of the journal’s membership. In 2018, a self-styled group of "faculty, alumni, and students opposed to racial preferences" sued New York University Law Review and Harvard Law Review over this practice. Both suits were dismissed in 2019 for lack of standing.

In 2019, the top 16 law schools in the United States all reported female editors-in-chief of their law reviews. For the first time in history, women led all of the law journals of the most prestigious U.S. law schools.

Canada 

In Canada, the fully student-run law reviews (without a Faculty editor-in-chief) include, in order of the frequency they are cited by the Supreme Court of Canada: the McGill Law Journal, the Osgoode Hall Law Journal, the Queen's Law Journal, the Alberta Law Review, University of British Columbia Law Review, the University of Ottawa Law Review, the Saskatchewan Law Review, and the University of Toronto Faculty of Law Review. The country also has several specialized publications run entirely by students.

Europe 

Outside North America, student-run law reviews are the exception rather than the norm. In Continental Europe law reviews are almost uniformly edited by academics. However, a small number of student-edited law reviews have recently sprung into existence in Germany (Ad Legendum, Bucerius Law Journal, Freilaw Freiburg Law Students Journal, Goettingen Journal of International Law, Hanse Law Review, Heidelberg Law Review, Marburg Law Review), the Netherlands (Ars Aequi, Groningen Journal of International Law) and the Czech Republic (Common Law Review). Two student-run publications have also been established in Italy: Bocconi Legal Papers, adopting the format of a working paper series, as a way to complement – rather than compete with – peer-reviewed publications and offer scholars an additional round of feedback; University of Bologna Law Review, a double-blind peer reviewed law journal, run by University of Bologna, School of Law students, which follows The Bluebook: A Uniform System of Citation.

Belgium 

In Belgium, the oldest and most prominent student-edited law review is Jura Falconis. It was founded by a group of students from the Law Faculty of the Katholieke Universiteit Leuven who, in 1964, conceived the idea of producing their own law journal grafted on the famous American law reviews. Since then, Jura Falconis has grown into a very solid and most unusual value in the Belgian legal literature.

France 
The articles in the leading law reviews in France are written by academics and lawyers, the principal editors are Dalloz, LexisNexis, Lamy (part of the international Wolters Kluwer group) and Francis Levebvre.

United Kingdom 

Within the United Kingdom, as in much of the Commonwealth outside North America (a notable exception being Australia), all of the leading law reviews are edited and run by academics. The leading law reviews in the United Kingdom and the Commonwealth more generally are the Law Quarterly Review (first published 1885), the Modern Law Review (first published 1937), the Cambridge Law Journal (first published 1973), The Oxford Journal of Legal Studies (first published 1981) and Legal Studies (first published 1981).

The Bracton Law Journal (now Exeter Law Review) was the first student-run law review when it began publishing in 1965. Since then, the Birkbeck Law Review, Bristol Law Review, Cambridge International Law Journal, Cambridge Student Law Review, Dundee Student Law Review, Durham Law Review, Cardiff Law Review, Edinburgh Student Law Review, King’s Student Law Review, Warwick Student Law Review, Southampton Student Law Review, Strathclyde Law Review, the UCL Human Rights Review and the Student Journal of Law have also emerged.

Italy 
The University of Bologna Law Review  is a student-run law journal published by the Department of Legal Studies of the University of Bologna, and officially sponsored by Cleary Gottlieb Steen & Hamilton LLP and the International Chamber of Commerce - Italy. Its editorial board is composed of more than 150 members, including students, scholars, and professionals from all over the world.

The Trento Student Law Review is a student-run law review based in Trento, Italy. Established in 2017, it published its first issue, titled "Number Zero", in January 2018.

Bocconi Legal Papers is a student-edited law journal in Italy. It is a project sponsored by Bocconi School of Law and is published by a group of students belonging to the same institution, under the supervision of several faculty advisors.

Ireland 

The main professionally edited law reviews in Ireland include the following:
Bar Review 
Commercial Law Practitioner
Construction, Engineering and Energy Law Journal
Conveyancing and Property Law Journal
Dublin University Law Journal
Hibernian Law Journal
Irish Criminal Law Journal
Irish Employment Law Journal
Irish Planning and Environmental Law Journal
Irish Probate Law Journal
Irish Law Times
Irish Journal of Family Law
Irish Journal of Practice and Procedure
Medico-Legal Journal of Ireland
The Irish Jurist

The leading student law reviews are the Dublin City University Law Review, the Trinity College Law Review, the UCD Law Review, the Irish Student Law Review and the Cork Online Law Review.

The Netherlands 

In the Netherlands, Ars Aequi is one of the few general legal journals. It has been published since 1951. It is edited by students from all faculties of law of Dutch universities, who review and edit submitted articles (peer review is not common in Dutch law journals). The quality of its publications are considered top-ranked in the Dutch legal discipline. Ars Aequi publishes articles written by established scholars, researchers and students. The editorial board does however not set different quality standards for student articles.

Ars Aequi has published its Black Issue in 1970, criticizing legal aid. It resulted in reforms of accessible legal aid in the Netherlands.

Nordic countries 
In Iceland, Úlfljótur Law Review, has been in publication since 1947. In 2007 it celebrated its 60th anniversary. Since its creation in 1947 it has been edited and run by students at the Department of Law, University of Iceland. Úlfljótur Law Review is the most senior of all academic journals still in publication at the university and held in great respect by Icelandic jurists and legal scholars.

In Finland, Helsinki Law Review, edited by students at the University of Helsinki, has been active since 2007. Earlier, the University of Turku published Turku Law Journal from 1999 to 2003.

Sweden's first law review is Juridisk Publikation. The first number of Juridisk Publikation was published in April 2009. It originated as a review by students from Stockholm University. It is now delivered to Swedish law students from all universities, as well as to most legal libraries in the country. Juridisk Publikation is edited by top students from the law schools in Lund, Stockholm Uppsala, Gothenborg and Umeå. The publication is anonymously peer reviewed by a board of leading Swedish legal practitioners and academics.

In Norway, the first student edited law review Jussens Venner was founded in 1952 by students Carsten Smith and Torkel Opsahl (both of whom later became distinguished academics). Occasionally it features peer-reviewed articles, but its editors are composed of one student from the Faculty of Law at the University of Oslo and one student from the Faculty of Law at the University of Bergen. Its articles are mainly related to the curriculum at these universities.

Argentina 
In spite of some few exceptions, in Argentina almost all law reviews are run by publishing houses or law professors. In both cases, the involvement of students in the day to day creation of these reviews is fully narrowed. Among these few exceptions, it should be mentioned the case of Revista Lecciones y Ensayos, a law review ran by students of the School of Law of the University of Buenos Aires.

Australia 

In Australia, the leading student-edited peer-reviewed academic law reviews are the Melbourne University Law Review, Sydney Law Review, Federal Law Review, Monash University Law Review and UNSW Law Journal.

The Melbourne University Law Review regularly outperforms Sydney Law Review on impact, citation in journal and cases and combined rankings. These publications are among the most-cited law reviews by the High Court of Australia and among the most cited non-US reviews by US journals.

The top international law journal in Australia is the Melbourne Journal of International Law, also a student-edited peer-reviewed academic law review.

Brazil 
In Brazil, law reviews are usually run by academics as well, but there are efforts by students to change this; for example: University of Brasilia Law Students Review (re-established in 2007), the Review of the Academic Center Afonso Pena from the Federal University of Minas Gerais (published since 1996), and the Alethes Periodic from Federal University of Juiz de Fora. However, academics and official rankings usually refuse to evaluate student law reviews as "equals". To pursue academic recognition by the Brazilian Ministry of Education, review bodies must include post-graduated and ranked academics, which prevents student law reviews to even be recognized or compared to other similar legal periodicals.

China 

In China, there are law reviews run by academics, as well as law reviews run by students.

The China Law Journal is an attempt to create a legal publication, that is produced from all groups related to law, including lawyers, academics, students, members of the judiciary, procurators and anyone else in related fields with an interest in China.

India 

Among academic law journals in India, the Journal of Indian Law Institute and the Delhi Law Review published by the Faculty of Law, University of Delhi since 1972 are most prominent and respected among Indian legal scholars and academicians. National Law Schools/Universities are now leading the law review publication field, with notable reviews being the NALSAR Student Law Review and the National Law School of India Review and lawbright, eJournal.

Mexico 
The Mexican Law Review, the law review of the National Autonomous University of Mexico, Mexico's preeminent university, is edited by professors and is therefore a closer cousin to peer-reviewed social science journals than to typical student-run law journals.

Online legal research providers 
Online legal research providers such as Westlaw and LexisNexis give users access to the complete text of most law reviews published beginning from the late 1980s. Another such service, Heinonline, provides actual scans of the pages of law reviews going back to the 1850s.

Student activity
Membership on the law review staff is highly sought after by some law students, as it often has a significant impact on their subsequent careers as attorneys. Many U.S. federal judges and partners at the most prestigious law firms were members or editors of their school's law review. There are a number of reasons why journal membership is desired by some students:
 Some see the intense writing, research and editing experience as invaluable to the student's development as an attorney;
 Others see the selection process as helping differentiate the best and the brightest from an already strong group of law students.
At schools with more than one law review, membership on the main or flagship journal is normally considered more prestigious than membership on a specialty law journal. This is not the case at all schools, however. At many schools, the more prestigious journal is the specialty journal; a low-ranked general journal will rarely attract as much attention as a category-leading specialized journal. Often the best indicator is the age of the journal; a newer journal will rarely have the same clout with employers that the older journal has, even when the older journal is specialized. In any case, membership on any such journal is a valuable credential when searching out employment after law school.

The paths to membership vary from law school to law school, and also from journal to journal, but generally contain a few of the same basic elements. Most law reviews select members after their first year of studies either through a writing competition (often referred to as "writing on" to the law review), their first-year grades (referred to as "grading on" to the law review) or some combination thereof. Most Canadian law reviews, however, do not take grades into considerations and cannot be submitted with the application. A number of schools will also grant membership to students who independently submit a publishable article. The write-on competition usually requires applicants to compose a written analysis of a specific legal topic, often a recent Supreme Court decision. The written submissions are often of a set length, and applicants are sometimes provided with some or all of the background research. Submissions normally are graded blindly, with submissions identified only by a number which the graders will not be able to connect to a particular applicant. A student who has been selected for law review membership is said to have "made the law review."

Secondary journals vary widely in their membership process. For example, at Yale Law School, the only one of its nine journals that has a competitive membership process is the flagship Yale Law Journal – all others are open to any Yale Law student who wishes to join. By contrast, other secondary journals may have their own separate membership competition, or may hold a joint competition with the main law review.

A law review's membership is normally divided into staff members and editors. On most law reviews, all 2Ls (second-year students) are staff members while some or all 3Ls (third-year students) serve as editors. 3Ls also typically fill the senior editorial staff positions, including senior articles editor, senior note & comment editor, senior managing editor, and, the most prestigious of all, editor-in-chief of the law review. (Upon graduation, the editor-in-chief of the law review can often expect to be highly recruited by the most prestigious law firms.) As members, students are normally expected to edit and cite-check the articles that are being published by the law review, ensuring that references support what the author claims they support and that footnotes are in proper Bluebook format, depending on the publication's preference. On some law reviews, students may be expected to write a note or comment of publishable quality (although it need not actually be published), although other law reviews often pull from a broader pool for submissions.

The editorial staff is normally responsible for reviewing and selecting articles for publication, managing the editing process, and assisting members in writing their notes and comments. Depending on the law school, students may receive academic credit for their work on the law review, although some journals are entirely extracurricular.

History of law reviews

United States

English and US law education in the early 19th century was dominated by the study of "discursive" treatises which examined older English case law. These treatises were written by eminent scholars of the era, but had diminishing relevance to a newly founded nation. The treatise format was also unsuited to communicate the rapid decisions of a young court system to an expanding population of lawyers. By the 1850s a number of legal periodicals had arisen in the US which "typically highlighted recent court decisions, local news, and editorial comments."  One of these periodicals, the American Law Register, was founded in 1852 and has been published continually since.  Now known as the University of Pennsylvania Law Review, it is the oldest surviving law review in the US.

By the 1870s, these early commercial legal periodicals established the format for a more "modern style of legal writing" and led to today's student-edited law reviews.  The first student-edited law periodical in the US was the Albany Law School Journal, founded in 1875. This journal, described as something like a "legal newspaper", folded after just one year.  Its spiritual successor, the current Albany Law Review was later published in 1936.

The Columbia Jurist was created by students in 1885, but ceased publication in 1887.  Despite its short lifespan, the Jurist is credited with inspiring creation of the Harvard Law Review, first published in 1887.  The current Columbia Law Review, was founded in 1901.

The success of the Harvard Law Review provided a model that was followed by later journals: faculty-written articles solicited and published by student editors. Yale Law Journal, first published in 1891, used this format to great success.  Other contemporary journals were launched by faculty with varying degrees of student input including Dickinson Law Review in 1897.

The West Virginia Bar, a publication by the state Bar Association started in 1894.  In 1917, editorship was taken over by the West Virginia College of Law and became the West Virginia Law Review in 1949.

The first law review originating outside the Northeast was the Michigan Law Review, beginning in 1902.  The Northwestern University Law Review—formerly the Illinois Law Review—followed shortly thereafter in 1906.  Both Michigan and Northwestern were launched by faculty and only later turned over to student editors.  Following these publications, there was a lull in new journals broken in 1908 by publication of the Maine Law Review which unfortunately ceased publication when the school closed in 1920.

The California Law Review, beginning in 1912, was the nation's first law review published west of Illinois.  The Georgetown Law Journal was launched that same year.

Additional US law reviews

 The Kentucky Law Journal - 1913 
Virginia Law Review - 1913
 The Marquette Law Review - 1916
 Stanford Law Review - 1948

See also

 Bar journal

References

External links
 Bernard Hibbitts, Last Writes? Re-assessing the Law Review in the Age of Cyberspace
 Current Issues of Top Law Reviews